Meredith McGrath and Arantxa Sánchez Vicario were the defending champions, but competed this year with different partners. McGrath teamed up with Larisa Neiland and lost in semifinals to Gabriela Sabatini and Brenda Schultz-McCarthy, while Sánchez Vicario teamed up with Jana Novotná and also lost in semifinals to Martina Hingis and Iva Majoli.

Gabriela Sabatini and Brenda Schultz-McCarthy won the title by defeating Martina Hingis and Iva Majoli 4–6, 6–0, 6–3 in the final.

Seeds
The first four seeds received a bye into the second round. Since seeds No. 4 withdrew from the tournament, seeds No. 9 took their place.

Draw

Finals

Top half

Bottom half

References
 Official Results Archive (ITF)
 Official Results Archive (WTA)

1995 WTA Tour
1995 in Canadian tennis
1995 Canadian Open (tennis)